Pinolillo is a sweet cornmeal and cacao-based traditional drink in Nicaragua, also consumed in Costa Rica. It is made of ground toasted corn and a small amount of cacao. It can be mixed with water or soy milk, and served sweetened or unsweetened. If unsweetened, it is rather bitter. The drink usually has a rough, gritty texture.

It is traditionally served out of a gourd made of the shell of the jicaro fruit. Decorative gourds are also made for purchase by tourists as souvenirs; such decorations are rarely found in the homes of native Nicaraguans.

Pinol and Nicaraguan culture
Consumption of pinolillo is so widespread and traditional that the substance has become one of many symbols of Nicaraguan culture. Nicaraguans often refer to themselves as "Pinoleras" and "Pinoleros", either jokingly or with pride. The patriotic phrase "" (I'm a pure Pinolero, Nicaraguan by the grace of God!) has been frequently used by Nicaraguans. The phrase comes from the patriotic song Nicaragua Mía by Tino López Guerra, which has been covered several times. The popular saying is often used by the Nicaraguan president, in his speeches.

See also

 List of maize dishes

References

Chocolate drinks
Nicaraguan cuisine
Costa Rican cuisine
Mesoamerican cuisine
Maize-based drinks